William Rudolph (died 27 May 1975) was an American film technician, who received an Academy Award for Technical Achievement.

Life 
Rudolph worked as a film technician for Paramount Pictures. At the 12th Academy Awards he received an Academy Award for Technical Achievement together with Farciot Edouart and Joseph E. Robbins for "the design and construction of a quiet portable treadmill".

Award 
 12th Academy Awards: Academy Award for Technical Achievement

References 

Academy Award for Technical Achievement winners
American film people
Date of birth unknown
1975 deaths